Blīdene Parish is an administrative unit of Saldus Municipality in the Courland region of Latvia. The administrative center is Blīdene village.

Towns, villages and settlements of Blīdene parish 
 Blīdene
 Pilsblīdene
 Stūri

References

External links 
 

Parishes of Latvia
Saldus Municipality
Courland